The following is a list of programs that are currently airing or have formerly aired on public television in the United States on the PBS Kids 24/7 Channel (the original channel and its revival) and the PBS Kids block on local PBS stations.

Current programming
 1 Co-distributed by Amazon Video, the official streaming partner for PBS Kids programming.
 2 Ended but still airing reruns.

Original programming

Outdated reruns
The following programs are currently airing on select local PBS stations only with outdated content. They are no longer distributed nationally, though are still available for local stations to air independently.

Interstitial programming
The following interstitials run for a minute and are usually shown at the start or end of the program.

Web series and short-form programming

Blocks

Programming from American Public Television
The following programs are distributed by American Public Television, not PBS itself. These programs are broadcast by select local PBS stations.

Programming from NETA
The following programs are distributed by National Educational Telecommunications Association, not PBS itself. These programs are broadcast by select local PBS stations.

Upcoming programming

Original programming

Former programming
 1 Co-distributed by Amazon Video, the official streaming partner for PBS Kids programming.

PTV Park

Original programming

Programming from American Program Service

Acquired programming

Blocks

PBS Kids

Original programming

Distributed by both PBS Kids and APT
The following programs were distributed by PBS Kids and American Public Television.

Programming from American Public Television
The following programs were distributed by American Public Television, not PBS itself. These programs were broadcast by select local PBS stations.

Acquired programming

Interstitial programming

Web series and short-form programming

Blocks

Special programming
Programs with marked with an asterisk (*) have been featured on the Family Night weekend primetime block on PBS Kids 24/7.

Special programming from American Public Television

Acquired special programming

See also
 List of programs broadcast by PBS
 List of programs broadcast by American Public Television

Notes

References

PBS Kids